A Secret History... The Best of the Divine Comedy is a greatest hits compilation album by Irish chamber pop band the Divine Comedy, released in 1999 by Setanta Records.

Release

The album was the last to be released by the band on the Setanta label and featured a collection of singles and best-known songs from the previous five studio albums. A new recording of "The Pop Singer's Fear of the Pollen Count" and a remixed version of "Your Daddy's Car"—both originally from the band's 1993 album Liberation—were included, along with two new tracks: "Gin Soaked Boy" and "Too Young to Die". The band's recording of Noël Coward's "I've Been to a Marvellous Party", from the tribute album Twentieth-Century Blues: The Songs of Noël Coward, was also included.

A limited edition was available with an accompanying hard-back book and extra CD of "rarities". The book featured Kevin Westenberg photographs taken from previous album photo shoots, interspersed with the recollections of people who had worked closely with the band, including Graham Linehan and Sean Hughes.

The additional CD, Rarities, featured a full disc of rare, live and demo recordings, including cover versions of tracks by David Bowie, Talk Talk and Kraftwerk. Of special interest was the inclusion of "Soul Destroyer", a demo of a track from sessions for the band's debut album, Fanfare for the Comic Muse, an album which had previously been all-but ignored from the back catalogue.

Track listing

Limited Edition Rarities CD

 "Painting the Forth Bridge" is an early version of the Casanova track "Middle Class Heroes", featuring completely different lyrics.

References

The Divine Comedy (band) compilation albums
1999 greatest hits albums
Setanta Records compilation albums